Kath Shelper is an Australian film producer, known for Samson and Delilah. Her production company is called Scarlett Pictures.

Career
Shelper's production credits include a number of short films and telemovies, including Confessions of a Headhunter, Plains Empty, Bush Mechanics, Above The Dust Level, and Green Bush.

Her first feature film, Samson and Delilah, was directed and filmed by Warwick Thornton, and she produced Beck Cole's first feature film, Here I Am in 2011.

In 2015, Shelper produced the film Ruben Guthrie, and between 2014 and 2020 produced many episodes of the TV comedy series, Black Comedy.

Production companies
She was a founding member of the film production company Film Depot along with fellow producers Louise Smith and Matthew Dabner, but since 1998 has worked out of her own production company, Scarlett Pictures.

Accolades
She was the recipient of the 2005 Inside Film Rising Talent Award.

Her first feature film, Samson and Delilah directed and filmed by Warwick Thornton, won the Camera d'Or for best first feature at the Cannes Film Festival 2009 and the Showtime Inside Film Award for Best Feature in 2009.

Selected filmography
 Samson and Delilah (2009)
 Here I Am (2011)

References

External links

Australian film producers
Year of birth missing (living people)
Living people